Narbonne (also , ;  ;  ; Late Latin:) is a commune in Southern France in the Occitanie region.

From the 14th century it declined following a change in the course of the river Aude. It is marginally the largest commune in Aude, but the capital of the Aude department is the smaller commune of Carcassonne.

Geography
Narbonne is linked to the nearby Canal du Midi and the river Aude by the Canal de la Robine, which runs through the centre of town. It is very close to the A9 motorway, which connects Montpellier and Nîmes to Perpignan and, across the border, to Barcelona in Spain. There is also a recently renovated train station which serves the TGV to Spain, Paris and Calais, which in turn connects to the Eurostar. Narbonne is only 10 km from Narbonne Plage (beach), but it is only 2 km from the nearest open water, at La Nautique, although there is no sand, rather pebbles.

Etymology
The source of the town's original name of Narbo is lost in antiquity, and it may have referred to a hillfort from the Iron Age close to the location of the current settlement or its occupants. The earliest known record of the area comes from the Greek Hecataeus of Miletus in the fifth century BC, who identified it as a Celtic harbor and marketplace at that time, and called its inhabitants the Ναρβαῖοι.  In ancient inscriptions the name is sometimes rendered in Latin and sometimes translated into Iberian as Nedhena.

History

Under the Romans
It was located on the Via Domitia, the first Roman road in Gaul, built at the time of the foundation of the colony, and connecting Italy to Spain. Geographically, Narbonne was therefore located at a very important crossroads because it was situated where the Via Domitia connected to the Via Aquitania, which led toward the Atlantic through Tolosa and Burdigala. In addition, it was crossed by the river Aude. Surviving members of Julius Caesar's Legio X Equestris were given lands in the area that today is called Narbonne. 

Politically, Narbonne gained importance as a competitor to Massilia (Marseille). Julius Caesar settled veterans from his 10th Legion there and attempted to develop its port while Marseille was supporting Pompey. Among the products of Narbonne, its rosemary-flower honey was famous among Romans.

Later, the province of Gallia Transalpina was renamed Gallia Narbonensis after the city, which became its capital. Seat of a powerful administration, the city enjoyed economic and architectural expansion. At that point, the city is thought to have had 30,000–50,000 inhabitants, and may have had as many as 100,000.

Under the Visigoths

According to Hydatius, in 462 the city was handed over to the Visigoths by a local military leader in exchange for support, as a result Roman rule ended in the city. It was subsequently the capital of the Visigothic province of Septimania, the only territory from Gaul to fend off the Frankish thrust after the Battle of Vouille (507). 
In 531, Frankish king, Childebert I, invaded Septimania and defeated Visigothic king, Amalaric near Narbonne and occupied the city. However, after Childebert's continued invasion to Catalonia failed, Amalaric's successor Theudis was able to reclaim the rich province of Septimania, including Narbonne. Following the loss of Toledo and Barcelona in 711/712, the last two kings of the Visigoths, Agila II and Ardo retreated to Narbonne, where they were able to resist Muslim attacks until 716.

Under the Arabs

For 40 years, from 719 to 759, Narbonne was part of the Umayyad Caliphate. The Umayyad governor Al-Samh captured Narbonne from the Kingdom of Visigoths in 719.

Under the Carolingians

The Carolingian Pepin the Short conquered Narbonne from the Arabs in 759 after which it became part of the Carolingian Viscounty of Narbonne. He invited  prominent Jews from the Caliphate of Baghdad to settle in Narbonne and establish a major Jewish learning center for Western Europe. In the 12th century, the court of Ermengarde of Narbonne (reigned 1134 to 1192) presided over one of the cultural centers where the spirit of courtly love was developed.

The historian Arthur J. Zuckerman wrote in 1973 the book A Jewish Princedom in Feudal France, presenting the thesis that from the 8th to 10 centuries AD there was a Jewish vassal princedom based in Narbonne, given to the Jews by the Carolingian king Pepin as a gift of gratitude for their cooperation in the Frankish conquest of Narbonne from Al-Andalus in the year 759. This is however controversial, the book having been criticized by other historians.

Under the Capets
In the 11th and 12th centuries, Narbonne was home to an important Jewish exegetical school, which played a pivotal role in the growth and development of the Zarphatic (Judæo-French) and Shuadit (Judæo-Provençal) languages. Jews had settled in Narbonne from about the 5th century, with a community that numbered about 2,000 people in the 12th century. At this time, Narbonne was frequently mentioned in Talmudic works in connection with its scholars. One source, Abraham ibn Daud of Toledo, gives them an importance similar to the exilarchs of Babylon. In the 12th and 13th centuries, the community went through a series of ups and downs before settling into extended decline.

Narbonne loses its river and port

Narbonne itself fell into a slow decline in the 14th century, for a variety of reasons. One was due to a change in the course of the river Aude, which caused increased silting of the navigational access. The river, known as the Atax in ancient times, had always had two main courses which split close to Salelles; one fork going south through Narbonne and then to the sea close to the Clappe Massif, the other heading east to the etang at Vendres close to the current mouth of the river well to the east of the city. The Romans had improved the navigability of the river by building a dam near Salelles and also by canalising the river as it passed through its marshy delta to the sea (then as now the canal was known as the Robine.) A major flood in 1320 swept the dam away. The Aude river had a long history of overflowing its banks. However, goods could easily be transported by land and in shallow barges from the ports (there were several: a main port and forward ports for larger vessels; indeed the navigability from the sea into the étang and then into the river had been a perennial problem)

The changes to the long seashore which resulted from the silting up of the series of graus or openings which were interspersed between the islands which made up the shoreline (St. Martin; St. Lucie) had a more serious impact than the change in course of the river. Other causes of decline were the plague and the raid of Edward, the Black Prince, which caused much devastation. The growth of other ports was also a factor.

Narbonne Cathedral
 Narbonne Cathedral, dedicated to Saints Justus and Pastor, provides stark evidence of Narbonne's sudden and dramatic change of fortunes when one sees at the rear of the structure the enormously ambitious building programme frozen in time, for the cathedral—still one of the tallest in France—was never finished. The reasons are many, but the most important is that the completed cathedral would have required demolishing the city wall. The 14th century also brought the plague and a host of reasons for retaining the 5th-century (pre-Visigothic) walls.

Yet the choir, side chapels, sacristy, and courtyard remain intact, and the cathedral, although no longer the seat of a bishop or archbishop, remains the primary place of worship for the Roman Catholic population of the city, and is a major tourist attraction.

Building of the Canal de la Robine

From the sixteenth century, eager to maintain a link to important trade, the people of Narbonne began costly work to the vestiges of the river Aude's access to the sea so that it would remain navigable to a limited draft vessel and also serve as a link with the Royal Canal. This major undertaking resulted in the construction of the Canal de la Robine, which was finally linked with the Canal du Midi (then known as the Royal Canal) via the Canal de Jonction in 1776.

In the 19th century, the canal system in the south of France had to compete with an expanding rail network, which could ship goods more quickly. The canals kept some importance as they were used to support the flourishing wine trade.

Despite its decline from Roman times, Narbonne held on to its vital but limited importance as a trading route. This has continued in more recent centuries.

Population

Sights
 The cathedral dating from 1272
 The Palais des Archevêques, the Archbishop's Palace, and its donjon with views over Narbonne
 Musée Archeologique, an archaeological museum in the town centre (currently closed - November 2019, most sections will be moved to new museum Narbo Via which is planned to open in September 2020)
Clos de la Lombarde - an archaeological site presenting the vestiges of Roman townhouses, bath houses, workshops from the 1st century BC to the 3rd century AD and the first Christian basilica in Narbonne (3rd/4th century AD). Link to website: http://www.amiscloslombarde.fr/ (site in French and English)
 The Roman Horreum, a former grain warehouse, built underground as a cryptoporticus
 Remains of the Via Domitia in the city center
 The canal, Canal de la Robine, running through the centre of the town
 The Halles covered market operates every day. The busiest times are Sunday and Thursday mornings.
 The nearby limestone massif known as La Clape and the beach at Narbonne plage

Sport
Narbonne is home to the rugby union team RC Narbonne founded in 1907. They play at the Parc des Sports Et de l'Amitié (capacity 12,000). They wear orange and black.

Transport
The Gare de Narbonne railway station offers direct connections to Paris, Barcelona, Toulouse, Marseille and many regional destinations. An extensive local system of buses and routes operated by Citibus.fr allow for easy public transport within Narbonne and surrounding communities. Travellers wishing to connect by plane arrive by airports in nearby Béziers, Carcassonne, Perpignan, Toulouse or Montpellier, as Narbonne does not have an airport.

Personalities
Carus, Roman emperor, from 282 to 283, known for his late victories against the Sassanid empire and the Germanic tribes
Varro Atacinus, Roman poet
Saint Sébastien, third-century Christian saint and martyr
Makhir of Narbonne, medieval Jewish scholar
Moshe ha-Darshan (11th century), chief of the yeshiva of Narbonne
Bonfilh, a Jewish troubadour from the city
Kalonymus ben Todros, (d. ca. 1194) was a Provençal rabbi who flourished at Narbonne in the second half of the twelfth century
 Joseph Barsalou (physician) (1600-1669), apothecary and physician whose family was from Narbonne
Guillaume Barthez de Marmorières, (1707-1799), civil engineer
Jean-Joseph Cassanéa De Mondonville, (1711-1772) violinist and composer
Léon Blum was born in Paris but was elected as Deputy for Narbonne in 1929, re-elected in 1932 and 1936
Pierre Reverdy, surrealist poet
Anaïs Napoleón, French-Spanish photographer
Charles Trenet, singer-songwriter
Dimitri Szarzewski, rugby player
Camille Lacourt, World champion swimmer
Ateyaba, French hip-hop artist
Benjamin Lariche, racing driver
Rabbinic family of Benveniste

See also
 A Jewish Princedom in Feudal France, a book presenting a thesis that there was a Jewish vassal princedom based in Narbonne in the 8th to 10th centuries AD.
 Bierzo Edict
 Corbières AOC
 Communes of the Aude department

International relations

Narbonne is twinned with:
 Aosta, Italy
 Grosseto, Italy
 Salford, England
 Weilheim, Germany

References

 Michel Gayraud, Narbonne antique des origines à la fin du IIIe siècle. Paris: De Boccard, Revue archéologique de Narbonnaise, Supplément 8, 1981, 591 p.
 Histoire de Narbonne, Jacques Michaud and André Cabanis, eds, Toulouse: Privat, 2004.
 L’Aude de la préhistoire à nos jours (under the direction of Jacques Crémadeilis), Saint-Jean-d’Angély, 1989.
 Les Audois : dictionnaire biographique, Rémy Cazals et Daniel Fabre, eds., Carcassonne, Association des Amis des Archives de l’Aude, Société d’Études Scientifiques de l’Aude, 1990.

Further reading

Narbonne on The Jewish Encyclopedia

External links

 Official website 
 3D stone from Roman era

 
Communes of Aude
Cities in Occitania (administrative region)
Subprefectures in France
110s BC establishments
118 BC
Populated places established in the 2nd century BC
Languedoc
Historic Jewish communities in Europe